Aodh mac Muirchertach Ua Dubhda was a King of Ui Fiachrach Muaidhe. He ruled in what is present day Ireland, and he perished in 1143 CE.

Annalistic reference

 1143. Aedh, son of Muircheartach Ua Dubhda, lord of Ui-Fiachrach of the North, and of Ui-Amhalghada, died.

External links
 http://www.ucc.ie/celt/published/T100005B/

References

 The History of Mayo, Hubert T. Knox, p. 379, 1908.
 Araile do fhlathaibh Ua nDubhda/Some of the princes of Ui Dhubhda, pp.676-681, Leabhar na nGenealach:The Great Book of Irish Genealogies, Dubhaltach Mac Fhirbhisigh (died 1671), eag. Nollaig Ó Muraíle, 2004-05, De Burca, Dublin.

People from County Sligo
Monarchs from County Mayo
12th-century Irish monarchs
1143 deaths
Year of birth unknown